The Revenant is a 2015 American survival drama film directed, co-produced and co-written by Alejandro G. Iñárritu. The screenplay by Iñárritu and Mark L. Smith is based in part on Michael Punke's novel of the same name, inspired by the experiences of frontiersman Hugh Glass in 1823. It stars Leonardo DiCaprio as Glass, and co-stars Tom Hardy, Domhnall Gleeson and Will Poulter. The film premiered at TCL Chinese Theatre on December 16, 2015. 20th Century Fox released it theatrically in the United States on December 25 as a limited release, expanding on January 8, 2016. The film was a commercial success, grossing $533 million worldwide on a budget of $135 million.

On the review aggregator Rotten Tomatoes, The Revenant holds a rating of 80%, based on 326 reviews, with an average rating of 7.9/10. The film garnered awards and nominations in a variety of categories with particular praise for its direction, cinematography and the performances of DiCaprio and Hardy. The Revenant received twelve nominations at the 88th Academy Awards, including Best Picture. It won Best Director (Iñárritu), Best Cinematography (Emmanuel Lubezki), and Best Actor (DiCaprio). DiCaprio also received awards in the Best Actor category at the 73rd Golden Globe Awards, 69th British Academy Film Awards, and 22nd Screen Actors Guild Awards. Iñárritu also won Best Director at the 68th Directors Guild of America Awards, and at the 69th British Academy Film Awards.

Accolades

References
General

 
 

Specific

External links
 

Revenant
2015-related lists